Zeno is a lunar impact crater located near the northwestern limb of the Moon. It lies to the east-southeast of the crater Mercurius. Farther to the east of Zeno, along the limb, is the well-formed crater Boss.

The rim of Zeno is slightly distorted and has received some erosion due to subsequent impacts. There is a depression in the surface attached to the eastern rim, forming a bulging extension. Small craters lie on the southern rim and across the interior of the northern wall. The crater Zeno B is attached to the exterior of the southwestern rim, and the distorted Zeno A is attached in turn to the western rim of Zeno B.

Satellite craters
By convention these features are identified on lunar maps by placing the letter on the side of the crater midpoint that is closest to Zeno.

References

 
 
 
 
 
 
 
 
 
 
 
 

Impact craters on the Moon